Eminent Technology is American audio electronics company based in Florida, established in 1983 by Bruce Thigpen. Their first product was an air bearing straight line tracking tonearm for phonograph playback, and was the first implementation of a captured air bearing for tonearm use. It was followed by a more advanced version of the tonearm.

In 1985 the company began developing planar magnetic loudspeakers and in 1987 introduced the world's first full range push-pull planar magnetic loudspeaker, the LFT-3. 
Another of the company's products is the Thigpen Rotary Woofer. Typical subwoofer products are inefficient at producing desired sound pressure levels at frequencies below 20 Hz, but the TRW is designed to cover the range down to 1 Hz of the sound spectrum. (The technical principle would allow even zero Hz.)

In the 90s Eminent Technology developed a smaller planar transducer for automotive applications.
This was adapted for computer speakers as the LFT-11, a multimedia speaker system,  The company licensed the technology to Sonigistix and it appeared in Monsoon and other brands.

Currently five US patents have been granted to Eminent Technology products. The company manufactures most of its products at its own facility in Tallahassee, Florida.

References

External links
Rotary Woofer site
International Audio Review site
Sound and Vision review
Stereophile discussion of Bruce Thigpen's contribution to turntable tonearm development, the linear-tracking tonearm
Michael Fremer writeup on Eminent Technology and the Rotary Woofer breakthrough
Eminent Technology website

Phonograph manufacturers
Loudspeaker manufacturers
Audio equipment manufacturers of the United States